Santa Maria del Faro is a church in the quartiere of Posillipo of Naples, Italy.

A church was founded here in the 13th century, and restored in the 18th century using designs by Ferdinando Sanfelice and under the patronage of the Mazza family. The Baroque church incorporates small fragments of Roman sarcophagi. It contains fragments of the Roman Villa of Pausylipon, which was the site of a Roman lighthouse; hence the name Santa Maria del Faro, "Saint Mary of the lighthouse".

Bibliography
Napoli e dintorni, Touring club Italia, Touring Editore, 2001.
Exterior of Church

References

Churches in Naples
Baroque architecture in Naples
18th-century Roman Catholic church buildings in Italy